The UEFA European Under-18 Championship 1968 Final Tournament was held in France.

Qualification

|}

Teams
The following teams entered the tournament. Eight teams qualified (Q) and eight teams entered without playing qualification matches.

  (Q)
  (Q)
 
  (Q)
  (Q)
  (host)
  (Q)
 
  (Q)
  (Q)
 
 
 
 
 
  (Q)

Group stage

Group A

Group B

Group C

Group D

Semifinals

Third place match

Final

External links
Results by RSSSF

UEFA European Under-19 Championship
Under-18
UEFA European Under-18 Championship
1968
UEFA European Under-18 Championship
UEFA European Under-18 Championship